Gjergj Bojaxhi is an Albanian politician and leader  Sfida për Shqipërinë.

Political career

Sfida për Shqipërinë
In 2016, Bojaxhi founded a party called Sfida për Shqipërinë. Bojaxhi was deputy minister of Economy, Trade and Energy from 2005 to 2007.

References

1974 births
Living people
Politicians from Tirana
Johns Hopkins University alumni
21st-century Albanian politicians